Joss Naylor, MBE (born 10 February 1936 at Wasdale Head) is an English fell runner who set many long-distance records, and a sheep farmer, living in the English Lake District. As his achievements increased he became better known as the King of the Fells or simply the Iron Man.

Biography 
Naylor was born in 1936 in Middle Row Farm, Wasdale Head, and attended school in Gosforth, leaving at 15 to work on the family farm.  Injuries in his youth led to operations aged 19 to remove cartilage from his right knee and aged 22 to remove two discs from his back. He took up running in 1960 aged 24, winning his first race, the Mountain Trial, in 1966. In 1971, he completed the Bob Graham Round, only the sixth person to do so, and continued to win races and set records through the 1970s and 1980s.
In 1978, following medical advice that his back was deteriorating, he reduced his farming activities (selling his cattle but retaining his sheep), and took a job training apprentices at Windscale.  In his seventies, he started spending winters in Spain, as cold weather caused circulation problems in his legs.

He married Mary in 1963. Their son, Paul, has now taken over the farm.

Fell-running achievements 
His fell running achievements include successive peak bagging records within the scope of the Bob Graham Round:

1971: 61 peaks in 23h37m
1972: 63 peaks in 23h35m
1975: 72 peaks, claimed to involve over 100 miles and about 38,000 feet of ascent in 23h20m (record stood until 1988)

His other fell running achievements include:
 1971: The National Three Peaks Challenge (Ben Nevis, Scafell Pike and Snowdon): 11 hours 54 minutes including driving time
1973: The Welsh 3000s - the 14 peaks of Snowdonia in 4 hours 46 minutes (record stood until 1988)
 1974: The Pennine Way: 3 days, 4 hours, 36 minutes (record stood until 1989)
1976:  Robin Hood Bay to St Bees: 41 hours
1979: The Lyke Wake Walk: 4 hours 53 minutes (set during the annual race) (record stood until 1981)
 1983: The Lakes, Meres and Waters circuit of 105 miles: 19 hours 20 minutes
 1986: (age 50) completed the Wainwrights in 7 days, 1 hour, 25 minutes (record stood until 2014)
 1997: (age 60) ran 60 Lakeland fell tops in 36 hours
 2006: (age 70) ran 70 Lakeland fell tops, covering more than 50 miles and ascending more than 25,000 feet, in under 21 hours.

Legacy 

He considered the 72 peak Lakeland circuit as his own greatest achievement, setting a record which stood unbroken for 13 years. He was appointed an MBE  for his services to sport and charity, and is included as one of Britain’s top 100 sports personalities in the 2007 book Best of British: Hendo’s Sporting Heroes, by sports journalist Jon Henderson. Olympic Gold medal winner and co-founder of the London Marathon Chris Brasher described Joss Naylor as 'The Greatest of Them All', a title he bestowed on Joss when he ran 72 Lake District mountains in 24 hours.

Naylor completed some of his achievements in extreme weather conditions (the 1972 63 peaks record in a severe storm, and the 1975 72 peaks record and large sections of the 1986 Wainwrights record in a heat wave), and he is noted for his ability to persevere despite pain and adversity. He is also noted for his humility and his generosity towards less talented runners, and in keeping with British fell-running traditions, he has frequently provided support or pacing for other runners attempting the same or similar challenges. However, on occasion he has been less enthusiastic about runners who differ from his approach by setting records only in optimum conditions or who use more scientific methods such as use of spreadsheets for planning attempts.

He created his own fell-running challenge, the Joss Naylor Lakeland Challenge, open to over-fifties only.  This runs 48 miles (77 km) from Pooley Bridge to Greendale Bridge, traversing 30 summits, with climbing of 17,000 feet (5182 m).

Naylor is the subject of a biography by Keith Richardson, and his fell running exploits are covered in detail in Steve Chilton's It's a hill, get over it: fell running's history and characters and in Richard Askwith's Feet in the Clouds.

See also
 Bill Smith (fell runner)
 Billy Bland (runner)
 British orienteers
 List of orienteers
 List of orienteering events
 Munro/ "Munro Bagging"

References

1936 births
Living people
English male long-distance runners
British orienteers
Male orienteers
Foot orienteers
Members of the Order of the British Empire
British fell runners
Peak bagging in the United Kingdom
British ultramarathon runners